Nil Ratan Dhar (2 January 1892 – 5 December 1986) was an Indian professor of soil science and chemistry at the University of Allahabad, known for discovering thermal and photo-chemical fixation of atmospheric nitrogen in the soil. He was the brother of a freedom fighter Jiban Ratan Dhar. He was known as the "father of Indian physical chemistry." Dhar was a founding member of many scientific organizations like The World Academy of Sciences, the National Academy of Sciences, India and the Sheila Dhar Institute of Soil Science, Allahabad.

Early life and education 
He was born on 2 January 1892 in Jolkhada, British India (now Jessore, Bangladesh) to Prassana Kumar Dhar, a lawyer, his grandfather, Prem Chand Dhar, was a Zamindar of the place. and his mother Nirode Mohini Dhar, the daughter of a local zamindar.

He obtained his DSc from University of London in 1917. In 1919, he earned a doctorate of science in France. He was awarded honorary DCs from Banaras Hindu University, University of Allahabad, Jadavpur University, Gorakhpur University and Visva-Bharati University.

Awards and memberships 

Dhar was a corresponding member of the Academy of Sciences, France and a foreign member of the French Academy of Agriculture. He was nominated for the Nobel prize four times. He was also a founding member of the Indian Chemical Society and the National Academy of Sciences, India, and the president of both organizations from 1933–1934 and 1935–1937 respectively. Though not a founding member, he also served as the president of the Indian Society of Soil Sciences. Dhar was also a member of the Society of Biological Chemists, India as well as a fellow of the Chemical Society of London and the Royal Institute of Chemistry. In 1961, he became the General President of the Indian Science Congress Association.

References 

Indian scientists
Indian academics
1892 births
1986 deaths
Scientists from West Bengal